Thomas Cooke (February 9, 1792 – April 30, 1870) was a Canadian Roman Catholic priest, missionary, and the first Bishop of Trois Rivières from 1852 to 1870.

References
 
 Thomas Cooke at Catholic-Hierarchy

1792 births
1870 deaths
Pre-Confederation Quebec people
Roman Catholic bishops of Trois-Rivières
19th-century Roman Catholic bishops in Canada